Nellie Ashford (born  1943) is a self-taught folk artist from Mecklenburg County, North Carolina. Her mixed-media folk art depicts the experiences of Charlotte’s African-American community during the era of Jim Crow in the U.S. South.

Early life and education 
Ashford grew up in a rural part of Mecklenburg County, and attended school in a segregated four-room schoolhouse. She later graduated from Plato Prince High School and earned a bachelor's degree in psychology and social science from Shaw University. She is self-trained as an artist.

Career 
Her work has been featured in a number of special exhibits since at least the early 2000s. She participated in a 2004 juried art show for the Afro-American Cultural Center in Charlotte, North Carolina, for which she earned the curator's recognition award. In 2010, her show "Nellie's People" was featured at the Delta Arts Center in Winston-Salem, North Carolina. In 2013, her work was displayed at the Gaston County Museum in Dallas, North Carolina. The Harvey B. Gantt Center for African American Arts+Culture hosted her first major-museum, solo exhibit in 2016. According to the Gantt Center, the solo exhibit, titled "Nellie Ashford: Through My Eyes," communicates "cultural identity, shared community values and aesthetics."

During the 2012 national election campaign, 11 of her works were featured at the Democratic National Convention Committee headquarters in Charlotte.

Awards 
She is a four-time recipient of the Actors Theatre award and a recipient of the Priscilla Literary Award. In 2007, she was named the Harvey B. Gantt Center's (then known as the Afro-American Cultural Center) artist of the year.

References 

Living people
1940s births
Artists from North Carolina
Folk artists
People from Mecklenburg County, North Carolina
Shaw University alumni
20th-century American women artists
21st-century American women artists